Haemoproteus columbae is a species of blood parasite related to Plasmodium and other malaria parasites.

Phylogenetic relationships among the Haemosporidia 
Haemoproteus columbae is a true member of the genus Haemoproteus, basal to other avian Parahaemoproteus species. Parahaemoproteus species have been subsequently split from Haemoproteus and are recognized as their own genus, sister to Plasmodium malaria parasites.

Transmission 
Haemoproteus columbae is transmitted by the pigeon louse fly, Pseudolynchia canariensis.

Pathology or host effects of infection with H. columbae 

Haemoproteus columbae infects pigeons. It is usually benign and does not reduce survival of its host. However, it can sometimes be fatal to young pigeons.
 

It is slated for genome sequencing.

References

Haemosporida
Poultry diseases
Veterinary protozoology
Parasites of birds